Jack-A-Dandy is a supervillain created by writer Alan Moore and artist Rob Liefeld, as guided by Mort Weisinger. The character is modeled after the Joker and the Riddler to be the archenemy of comic book hero Professor Night, which is a character based on the Batman mythos.

His gimmick consists of dressing like an early twentieth century high society gentleman and creating havoc out of boredom. In one of the Supreme earlier stories, he teams up with Darius Dax to switch Supreme and Professor Night's minds, but the duo manage to reverse the effect and switch the minds of the two villains.

Fictional gangsters
Characters created by Alan Moore